15 (Edmonton) Field Ambulance (15 (Edm) Fd Amb) is a Canadian Forces Primary Reserve medical unit headquartered in Edmonton, Alberta, with a detachment in Calgary (15 (Edmonton) Field Ambulance Detachment Calgary). The unit mission is to attract, train, force generate and retain high-quality health service personnel to provide health service support to 41 Canadian Brigade Group and to augment CF domestic and international operations. An additional and important activity is to participate in activities that will raise its profile in Edmonton and Calgary.

History
15 (Edmonton) Field Ambulance's lineage originates with No. 4 Casualty Clearing Station mobilized in December 1939 as one of the medical units of the 1st Canadian Division for service overseas during the second world war.  4 CSS departed Halifax on 30 Jan 1940 embarked in the Empress of Britain and disembarked along the Clyde on 8 February 1940. The unit was directed to Aldershot where it spent the next three years. The medical services of  4 CCS during the winter of 1941–42 were provided in a large country house that accommodated 130 patients. Patients expected to be ill for more than three or four days were transferred from a field ambulance to the CCS.

During the Dieppe Raid,  4 CCS remained in Dorking, England. Casualties from the battle were evacuated by landing craft back to the casualty reception area at Portsmouth and  4 CCS handled the walking wounded.

In 1943  4 CCS was sent to Sicily and operated in Catania providing care for sick and injured Canadian soldiers. The unit followed the battle of the I Canadian Corps through Ortona to the Gustav Line, on to the Hitler Line and Northern Italy. In 1945, the unit moved to Marseilles, France, and to Belgium and finally into the Netherlands.  4 CCS opened with attached surgical and transfusion units in Brakkenstein, near Nijmegen.

At war's end,  4 CCS returned to Canada and was re-designated  36 Casualty Clearing Station in the Militia. In 1954, the unit was once again re-designated  23 Medical Company (Royal Canadian Army Medical Corps). 23 Med Coy trained to achieve the highest standards and won the Ryerson Trophy each year from 1961 to 1964, and 1972 to 1974.

In 1978  23 Medical Company was once again redesignated as 15 (Edmonton) Medical Company. In 1991, 14 Medical Platoon of 14 (Calgary) Service Battalion was reassigned and became 15 (Edmonton) Medical Company Detachment Calgary. In 2004, subsequent to the reorganization of all Canadian Forces medical and dental units into the Canadian Forces Health Services Group, the militia medical companies were re-designated and organized as Reserve field ambulances and the unit became 15 (Edmonton) Field Ambulance with its detachment 15 (Edmonton) Field Ambulance Detachment Calgary.

Present day
15 (Edm) Fd Amb is a unit of 1 Health Services Group (1 HSG) and under operational control (OPCON) of 41 Canadian Brigade Group, consisting of all Alberta Army Reserve personnel. As a Canadian Forces (CF) Primary Reserve unit, members may serve on a full or part-time basis. Deployments are voluntary, and personnel continue to serve alongside Regular Force CF members. The Edmonton unit is based at Brigadier James Curry Jefferson Building, and in Calgary at the Mewata Armoury. The current Commanding Officer (CO)is Lieutenant-Colonel David Allen, CD (Apr 2019) and the current Regimental Sergeant Major (RSM) is Chief Warrant Officer Suzanne McAdam, MMM, CD (Sep 2019).

Command team

Past commanding officers (incomplete list)
 Lieutenant-Colonel David Allen,  (2019–PRES)
 Lieutenant-Colonel Marie Lubiniecki, CD (2016–2019)
 Commander Robert Briggs, CD, MD, CCFP (2013–2016)
 Lieutenant-Colonel Roger Scott, CD, AdeC, PhD, NP (2007–2013). Post-command served as Deputy Commander 1 Health Services Group. Promoted Colonel Feb 2015. Appointed Director Health Services Reserve Oct 2015– May 2021. Appointed Officer of the Order of Military Merit 4 Oct 2018. Appointed Director Reserves Jun 2021. Promoted Brigadier-General Nov 2021 and appointed Director General External Reviews Implementation Secretariat becoming the first Health Services Reserve Officer to attain general officer rank.
 Lieutenant-Colonel Ross Purser, CD, MD, CCFP(EM) (2004–2007)
 Lieutenant-Colonel Louise Leslie, CD (2001–2004)
 Lieutenant-Colonel J.W. Cutbill, CD, MD, MSc, CCFP (2000–2001)
 Major Steve Merrette, CD (1999)
 Major Louise Leslie, CD (1998–1999)
 Lieutenant-Colonel Jim Hennessey (1997–1998)
 Major Jim N. Slauenwhite, CD (1994–1997)
 Lieutenant-Colonel M.L. Quinn, OMM, SSStJ, CD, RN (1991–1994). Appointed Officer of the Order of Military Merit 29 Nov 1993. Post-Command was promoted Colonel and became first woman to command a Canadian Brigade Group (41 CBG) in 1997. Appointed first Reserve Advisor to Commander Canadian Forces Health Services Group (later Director Health Services Reserve) from 2000 to 2007.
 Lieutenant-Colonel Jacqueline McLellan (1985–1991)
 Lieutenant-Colonel Hudson (1982–1985)
 Lieutenant-Colonel Scotty Lamb (1980–1982)
 Major Bob Salzman (1979–1980)
 Major Donna Lynch (1977–1978)
 Lieutenant-Colonel E.S.O. Smith (1977)
 Major Wilfred Berry (1975–1976)
 Lieutenant-Colonel Frank C. Haley, CD, MD (1969–1974)
 Lieutenant-Colonel E.S.O. Smith (1968–1969 TBC)
 Lieutenant-Colonel H.A. Schwarz, CD, MD, CCFP (Date TBC)
 Lieutenant-Colonel MacPherson (Date TBC)
 Lieutenant-Colonel Downs (Date TBC)
 Lieutenant-Colonel M. Weinlos (Date TBC)

Past regimental sergeants-major
Master Warrant Officer Kristopher Porlier CD, BSc, ACP (2022-PRES)
 Chief Warrant Officer Suzanne McAdam (2019-2022)
 Chief Warrant Officer Rudy Schmidtke (2016–2019)
 Chief Warrant Officer Mark R. Noble (2011–2016)
 Master Warrant Officer Linda M. Weidmann (2006–2011)
 Master Warrant Officer Dwight B. Fudge (2005–2006)
 Vacant (2002–2005)
 Chief Warrant Officer Bob L. Page (2001–2002)
 Chief Warrant Officer T.D. (Dick) Greuter (1997–2001)
 Chief Warrant Officer Cecil F. Shaver (1995–1997)
 Chief Warrant Officer Carson G. Woodman (1991–1995)
 Warrant Officer T.D. (Dick) Greuter (1990–1991)
 Warrant Officer Linda M. Wheeler (Weidmann) (1982–1990)
 Vacant (1981–1982)
 Warrant Officer R. Short (1980–1981)
 Vacant (1979–1980)
 Warrant Officer Vic Mottershead (1978–1979)
 Vacant (1977–1978)
 Sergeant Dave Vicen (1975–1977)
 Warrant Officer Jim Beauchamp (1970–1975)
 Master Warrant Officer J.D. Newel (1965–1970)
 Regimental Sergeant-Major W. Radulski (1963–1965)
 Vacant (1962–1963)
 Regimental Sergeant-Major W. Kendall (1961–1962)
 Regimental Sergeant-Major A.C. Duncan (1959–1961)
 Regimental Sergeant-Major L.S. Hooper (1953–1959)
 Regimental Sergeant-Major R. Miller (1945–1953)

Past honorary colonels
 Colonel Stewart Hamilton, MD, FRCSC, FACS (2015–201x)
 Vacant (2012–2015)
 Colonel the Honorable Allan H. Wachowich (2008–2012)
 Colonel James Donald Johnston (2003–2006)
 Colonel Kenneth Angus Munn (1993–2003)
 Colonel Harald A.J. Schwarz

Past honorary lieutenant-colonels
 Lieutenant-Colonel Gord Steinke (2012–2021)
 Vacant (2011–2012)
 Lieutenant-Colonel Sandra J. Munn (2005–2011)
 Lieutenant-Colonel Kenneth Angus Munn (1991–1993)
 Lieutenant-Colonel Robert James Sinclair Gibson
 Lieutenant-Colonel R.C. Bray
 Lieutenant-Colonel Harald A. Schwarz

Members killed on duty
 Colonel H.A.J. Schwarz
 Corporal Michael Starker – born January 1, 1972, died May 6, 2008, Pashmul Region, Zhari district (25 km west of Kandahar) Afghanistan – was both a soldier and a Calgary Emergency Medical Services paramedic.
 Master Warrant Officer J.D.Newel born 1919 died 2007.

Awards
 2014
75th Anniversary of the unit (1939-2014)
 Freedom of the City of Edmonton and Calgary.
 St John Ambulance Alberta Council Provincial First Aid Competitions
 2013
 Best Emergency Responder Team - Corporals T. Woroniuk, B. Warick, C. Livesy and J. Augustyn.
 2012
 Best Standard First Aid Team Captain – Private J. Fillion
 Best Novice Team – 15 (Edmonton) Field Ambulance: Privates Fillion, Dorrance, Behnke and Waite.
 2010
 Best Emergency Responder Team Captain – Sergeant K.N. Porlier
 Best Novice Team – 15 (Edmonton) Field Ambulance: Sergeant K. Porlier, Corporal C. Amberley, Corporal E. Lau, Private A. Nichols.
 2007
 Best Emergency Responder Team Captain – Sergeant V.E. Churchill

Operations
15 Field Ambulance members have deployed in many domestic and international operations including:
Operation Unifier(Ukraine)
 Operation Provision (Syrian Refugee Response)
 Operation Lentus (Southern Alberta Flooding)
 Operation Athena (Afghanistan)
 Operation Podium (2010 Olympic Games, British Columbia)
 Operation Archer (Afghanistan)
 Operation Peregrine (2003 British Columbia Forest Fires)
 Operation Danaca (Golan Heights)
 Operation Palladium (Bosnia-Herzegovina)
 United Nations Emergency Force (UNEF) (Egypt)

Royal Canadian Army Cadets
15 (Edmonton) Field Ambulance is affiliated with 2995 Medical Company RCACC, based in Lac La Biche, Alberta.

References

Medical units and formations of Canada
Military units and formations established in 2004